Gloria is a 1977 French drama film directed by Claude Autant-Lara and starring Nicole Maurey, Maurice Biraud and Andrée Tainsy. The film's sets were designed by the art director Max Douy. It was the director Autant-Lara's last film after a lengthy career in cinema and he turned to politics soon afterwards.

Cast
 Valérie Jeannet as 	Gloria Laurier
 Sophie Grimaldi as 	Florence Laurier
 Nicole Maurey as Alice de Clermont
 Maurice Biraud as 	Stéphane Perreau
 Andrée Tainsy as 	Estelle - la gouvernante
 Dorothée Jemma as 	Lili Clape
 Alain Marcel as 	Jacques
 Jean-Luc Boisserie as Jacques enfant
 Grégoire Aslan as 	Le patron du cabaret
 Christian Alers as 	Le docteur
 Robert Dalban as L'aboyeur
 Jean Martinelli as 	Le grand-père de Jacques
 Valérie Mokhazni as	Gloria Laurier enfant
 Pierre Zimmer as 	Hervé de Clermont
 Jean Lanier as Le colonel
 Jean Vinci as L'invité
 André Gaillard as 	Le présentateur du cabaret
 Antoine Marin as 	L'impresario
 Raymond Loyer as 	Le chauffeur d'Alice
 René Havard as 	Le chauffeur de taxi qui a fait la Marne
 Marcel Azzola as Un accordéoniste
 Joss Baselli as Un accordéoniste

References

Bibliography 
 Oscherwitz, Dayna & Higgins, MaryEllen. The A to Z of French Cinema. Scarecrow Press, 2009.

External links 
 

1977 films
French drama films
1977 drama films
1970s French-language films
Gaumont Film Company films
Films directed by Claude Autant-Lara
Films based on French novels
Films set in the 1900s
French historical films
1970s historical films
1970s French films